The following Union Army and Confederate Army units and commanders fought in the Battle of Hanover Court House of the American Civil War.

Abbreviations used

Military rank
 BG = Brigadier General
 Col = Colonel
 Ltc = Lieutenant Colonel
 Cpt = Captain

Confederate
BG Lawrence O'Bryan Branch

Union

V Corps
BG Fitz John Porter

See also

 Virginia in the American Civil War

References
 Hardy, Michael C. The Battle of Hanover Court House:  Turning Point of the Peninsula Campaign, May 27, 1862 (Jefferson, NC:  McFarland & Company, Inc.), 2006.  

American Civil War orders of battle